Surowitz v. Hilton Hotels Corp., 383 U.S. 363 (1966), was a case in which the Supreme Court of the United States held that the Federal Rules of Civil Procedure did not require courts to summarily dismiss fraud cases when the complaints were based on a thorough examination.

References

External links

1966 in United States case law
United States Supreme Court cases
United States Supreme Court cases of the Warren Court
United States civil procedure case law
Hilton Worldwide